Chinese Grand Prix is a Formula One motor race.

Chinese Grand Prix may also refer to:

Chinese motorcycle Grand Prix
One of the FAI World Grand Prix aerobatics competitions
Chinese Taipei Open  Grand Prix Gold badminton championship

See also